Ugaki is a Japanese surname. Notable people with the surname include:

, Japanese voice actor
, Japanese general
, Japanese admiral and poet
, Japanese announcer

See also
Bounts in Bleach series for a character in the anime series Bleach

Japanese-language surnames